Vladimir Anatolievich Zubkov (born 30 April 1948) is a retired Greco-Roman wrestler from Russia. He won the world light-flyweight title in 1971 and 1973–1975, placing second in 1970, and competed at the 1972 Summer Olympics. After retiring from competitions he worked as a wrestling coach, and is currently training the Austrian national team.

References

External links
 

1948 births
Living people
Russian male sport wrestlers
Olympic wrestlers of the Soviet Union
Wrestlers at the 1972 Summer Olympics
Soviet male sport wrestlers
Sportspeople from Novosibirsk